Sathamangalam is a village in the Ariyalur taluk of Ariyalur district, Tamil Nadu, India.

Demographics 

 census, Sathamangalam had a total population of 2718 with 1390 males and 1328 females.

References 

Villages in Ariyalur district